The 2014 Wests Tigers season was the 15th season in the joint venture club's history. They competed in the 2014 NRL season.

Ladder

Results

Auckland Nines

Trial matches

Regular season

Wests Tigers seasons
Parramatta Eels season